Ciepiela is a Polish surname. Notable people with the surname include:

 Bartłomiej Ciepiela (born 2001), Polish footballer
 Jan Ciepiela (born 1981), Polish sprinter

See also
 
 Ciepielów (disambiguation)

Polish-language surnames